The Iraq War, along with the War in Afghanistan, was described by President of the United States George W. Bush as "the central front in the War on Terror", and argued that if the U.S. pulled out of Iraq, "terrorists will follow us here." The ensuing conflict in Iraq has seen prolonged American involvement in the country against multiple terrorist and non-terrorist groups.

As the conflict dragged on, members of the U.S. Congress, the American public, and even U.S. troops have questioned the connection between the Iraq War and the fight against terrorism. Multiple leading intelligence experts have argued that the war in Iraq actually increased terrorism.

Terrorism in Iraq 

According to the Israel Intelligence Heritage & Commemoration Center, Saddam Hussein had a long history before the invasion of giving money to families of suicide bombers in Palestine. As part of the justification for the war, the Bush Administration argued that Saddam Hussein also had ties to al-Qaeda, and that his overthrow would lead to democratization in the Middle East, decreasing terrorism overall. However, reports from the CIA, the U.S. State Department, the FBI, and the Senate Select Committee on Intelligence, as well as the investigations of foreign intelligence agencies found no evidence of an operational connection between Saddam and al-Qaeda.

Some intelligence experts argue that the Iraq war has increased terrorism. Counterterrorism expert Rohan Gunaratna frequently refers to the invasion of Iraq as a "fatal mistake."  London's conservative International Institute for Strategic Studies concluded in 2004 that the occupation of Iraq had become "a potent global recruitment pretext" for jihadists, and that the invasion "galvanized" al-Qaeda and "perversely inspired insurgent violence" there.  The U.S. National Intelligence Council concluded in a January 2005 report that the war in Iraq had become a breeding ground for a new generation of terrorists. David B. Low, the national intelligence officer for transnational threats, indicated that the report concluded that the war in Iraq provided terrorists with "a training ground, a recruitment ground...over time, the likelihood that some of the jihadists who are not killed there will, in a sense, go home, wherever home is, and will therefore disperse to various other countries." The Council's Chairman Robert L. Hutchings said, "At the moment, Iraq is a magnet for international terrorist activity."  And the 2006 National Intelligence Estimate, which outlined the considered judgment of all 16 U.S. intelligence agencies, held that "The Iraq conflict has become the 'cause celebre' for jihadists, breeding a deep resentment of US involvement in the Muslim world and cultivating supporters for the global jihadist movement."  According to Mohammed Hafez, "Since 2003, the number of suicide bombings in Iraq has surpassed all those of Hamas in Israel, Hezbollah in Lebanon, and the Tamil Tigers in Sri Lanka combined."

Al-Qaeda 

Following the initial invasion of Iraq in 2003, the conflict quickly shifted against fighting numerous insurgencies. This included multiple terrorist groups, most notably Al-Qaeda in Iraq. Al-Qaeda leaders have seen the Iraq war as a boon to their recruiting and operational efforts, providing evidence to jihadists worldwide that America is at war with Islam, and the training ground for a new generation of jihadists.  In October 2003, Osama bin Laden announced: "Be glad of the good news: America is mired in the swamps of the Tigris and Euphrates. Bush is, through Iraq and its oil, easy prey. Here is he now, thank God, in an embarrassing situation and here is America today being ruined before the eyes of the whole world." Al-Qaeda commander Seif al-Adl gloated about the war in Iraq, indicating, "The Americans took the bait and fell into our trap."  A letter thought to be from al-Qaeda leader Atiyah Abd al-Rahman found in Iraq among the rubble where al-Zarqawi was killed and released by the U.S. military in October 2006, indicated that al-Qaeda perceived the war as beneficial to its goals: "The most important thing is that the jihad continues with steadfastness ... indeed, prolonging the war is in our interest.".

ISIS 
From 2011, the conflict in Iraq shifted into the fight against the Islamic State. From 2011-2013, this insurgency was marked by the rapid rise of the Islamic State of Iraq, escalating dramatically during the War in Iraq (2014-2017). This conflict continues as part of a low level insurgency from the Islamic State since 2017.

Public opinion

At the outset of the war, the U.S. Congress and public opinion supported the notion that the Iraq War was part of the global war on terror.  The 2002 Congressional resolution authorising military force against Iraq cited the U.S. determination to "prosecute the war on terrorism", and in April 2003, one month after the invasion, a poll found that 77% of Americans agreed that the Iraq War was part of the War on Terror. Much of the organized violence encountered by the U.S. military was framed by the metaphor of a crusade, or total conflict, that was taken up by the terrorists. In 2004, an Army War College report said the war diverts attention and resources from the threat posed by Al Qaeda and called for downsizing the war on terror and focusing instead on the threat from Al Qaeda.

As the military and civilian death toll has mounted, the Iraqi insurgency has shifted to what many observers have labeled a civil war, and the politics of Iraq have remained unstable, many politicians and citizens from the United States and across the world have begun pushing for the U.S. to withdraw from Iraq.
 
As of spring 2007, surveys showed a majority of Americans in support of a timetable for withdrawal. While up to 70 percent of Americans in one survey favored withdrawal, most prefer to leave gradually over 12 months, and 60 percent say the U.S. has a moral obligation to the Iraqi people.  In addition to voicing concerns over the human and financial costs of the war, supporters of withdrawal argue that the U.S. presence fosters ongoing violence by providing a target for al-Qaeda. It also allows Iraqi political leaders to avoid reaching a power-sharing agreement. The withdrawal will induce Iraq's neighbors to become more involved in quelling violence in the country and will relieve the strain on the U.S. military.  The withdrawal debate has brought comparison of Iraq and Vietnam wars.

After the 2006 midterm Congressional elections, Congress has pushed to begin withdrawing troops from Iraq, in part based on the argument that Iraq is a distraction, as opposed to a part of, the war on terror.  Likewise, a January 2007 poll found that 57% of Americans feel that the Iraq War is not part of the War on Terror. By June 2007, polls revealed that only 30% of Americans support the war. On July 12, 2007 the House passed a resolution by 223 to 201, for redeployment [or withdrawal] of U.S. armed forces out of Iraq.  The resolution requires most troops to withdraw from Iraq by April 1, 2008.

See also
Iraqi Conflict (2003-present)
Iraq War (2003-2011)
Iraqi insurgency (2011-2013)
War in Iraq (2013-2017)
Islamic State insurgency in Iraq (2017-present)

References

Iraq–United States relations
War on terror
Iraq War